Volodymyr Volodymyrovych Melnychenko (born 25 February 1932, Kyiv) — Ukrainian artist, sculptor, architect, Honored Artist of Ukraine, member of the National Union of Artists of Ukraine, member of the All-Ukrainian Creative Union "Congress of Writers of Ukraine", honorary member of the National Union of Cinematographers of Ukraine, honorary citizen of Naryan-Mar.

Works in architecture, sculpture, painting, graphics, monumental art: mosaic, ceramics, metal, design, plastic modeling. Author of screenplays for documentaries. Works in art photography.

Childhood 
He was born on 25 January 1932 in Kyiv. During the German occupation of Kyiv he lived in a children's boarding school. After the war he lived with his mother, Vera Danylivna.

In 1950 he graduated from the Kyiv Art School. T. Shevchenko.

In 1951 he entered the Kyiv State Art Institute, studied in the studio in the first year of M. Sharonov, Irzhakovsky, in the third year with T. Yablonska, from the fourth - the workshop of K.D. Trokhimenko.

Life in the Arctic 
1954 — together with Ada Rybachuk (wife) takes his first trip to the North, staying in May and June on the White Sea, and in July and September — on the Kolguyev Island.

1955 — got the topic of diploma work approved (“Winter shore of the White Sea. Kolguyev Island”), together with Ada Rybachuk goes on the second expedition to the North, which lasted one and a half years.

1956-1957 — diploma paintings by Ada Rybachuk and Volodymyr Melnychenko (the painting "September 1", donated to a museum in Naryan-Mar in 1959) were painted on Kolguyev Island.

1957 —participation with his paintings of the  6th World Festival of Youth and Students in Moscow. A. Rybachuk — silver prize, painting "Shipboy", V. Melnychenko — "Ada. Tea Island".

Meeting with Rockwell Kent 

Rockwell Kent   traveled to the Soviet Union and found like-minded people there. In the preface to the second Russian edition of his book "Salamina", Kent wrote:

"Recently… I’ve met two talented young artists from Kiyv  Ada Rybachuk  and Volodymyr Melnychenko. They lived and worked in the Soviet Arctic, just like me, they love the North and its inhabitants… Shouldn't art reveal the essence of Humanity? .. We who strive to create a better world for people must know the clay from which we form man.»

Art 
Volodymyr Melnychenko worked in a creative tandem with Ada Rybachuk. All joint works - monumental works, architecture, sculpture and films - were signed with the abbreviation ARVM.

The most famous works of Ada Rybachuk and Volodymyr Melnychenko:

 Central Bus Station (Kyiv, 1960): design, color sculpture, decorative and monumental works, sketches of fabrics 1961-1962
 Palace of Children and Youth (Kyiv, 1963-1968): design, elements of landscaping, monumental works - mosaics in the hall of aesthetic education of children, "Children of the World" "Magic Violin" (dedicated to Maria Pryimachenko)
 "Flower of Fire" is a sculptural sculpture of the composition "Torch", a decorative relief made of colored concrete. Area 33 square meters. m.

References 

1932 births
Ukrainian sculptors
Ukrainian male sculptors
Living people
Artists from Kyiv